Olpe station is a railway station in the municipality of Olpe, located in the Olpe district in North Rhine-Westphalia, Germany.

References

Railway stations in North Rhine-Westphalia
Olpe (district)